The 2000 Torneo Internazionali Femminili di Palermo was a women's tennis tournament played on outdoor clay courts in Palermo, Italy that was part of the Tier IV Series of the 2000 WTA Tour. It was the 13th edition of the Internazionali Femminili di Palermo and took place from 10 July until 16 July 2000. Unseeded Henrieta Nagyová won the singles title and earned $16,000 first-prize money.

Finals

Singles
 Henrieta Nagyová defeated  Pavlina Nola, 6–3, 7–5
It was Nagyová's 2nd singles title and the 9th of her career.

Doubles

 Silvia Farina Elia /  Rita Grande defeated  Ruxandra Dragomir /   Virginia Ruano Pascual, 6–4, 0–6, 7–6(8–6)

References

External sources
 ITF tournament edition details
 Tournament draws

Torneo Internazionali Femminili di Palermo
Torneo Internazionali Femminili di Palermo
Internazionali Femminili di Palermo
Torneo